1958 in professional wrestling describes the year's events in the world of professional wrestling.

List of notable promotions 
Only one promotion held notable shows in 1958.

Calendar of notable shows

Championship changes

EMLL

NWA

Debuts
Debut date uncertain:
Abdullah the Butcher
Ángel Blanco
Dominic DeNucci
Gene Anderson
Kurt Von Steiger
Pat Patterson
Toru Tanaka
March  Don Manoukian
May 2  El Matemático
June  Johnny Saint
November 11  Pedro Morales

Births
January 4  Jim Powers
January 5  Awesome Kong(died in 2012)
January 8  Rey Misterio
January 10  Jerry Estrada
January 30  Rocky King (died in 2022) 
January 31  Dave Finlay
February 3  Kerry Brown (wrestler) (died in 2009) 
February 4  Outback Jack (wrestler)
February 7  Rusty Brooks (died in 2021)
February 8  Sensational Sherri(died in 2007)
February 19  Tommy Cairo
March 10: 
Máscara Año 2000
Pierroth Jr.
March 16  Mike McGuirk
March 22  Wayne Bloom
March 24  Dieusel Berto (died in 2018) 
March 28  Curt Hennig(died in 2003)
March 30  Mike Rotunda
April 17  Nailz
May 5  Wally Yamaguchi(died in 2019)
May 15  Ron Simmons 
May 20  Nikolai Zouev (died in 2022)
May 28  Barry Orton(died in 2021)
June 2  Lex Luger
June 8  Dan Severn
June 16  Ted Arcidi
June 18  Tommy Stewart
June 23  George Takano
June 24:
Tiny Lister(died in 2020)
Chicky Starr
June 25  Damien Demento
July 1  Tom Magee
July 19  Robert Gibson
July 22  David Von Erich(died in 1984)
July 26  Romano Garcia 
August 12  Motor City Madman
August 14  Bobby Eaton (died in 2021)
August 22:
Stevie Ray
Brady Boone(died in 1998)
August 25  Len Denton
August 30  King Kaluha
September 3  Shiro Koshinaka
September 20  Arn Anderson
September 6  The Barbarian
October 15  Jeff Gaylord(died in 2023) 
October 20  Scott Hall(died in 2022) 
November 21:
Ricky Santana
Johnny Rich 
November 26  El Texano(died in 2006)
November 30  Tom Zenk(died in 2017)
December 5  Dynamite Kid(died in 2018)
December 7  Rick Rude(died in 1998)
December 21  El Tirantes

Deaths
February 23  Dean Detton, 49  
April 25  Herman Hickman, 46
June 20  Dan McLeod, 97 
July 17  Americus, 74

References

 
professional wrestling